Hubei may refer to:

Hubei (湖北), a province of China
Hubei, Fujian (虎贝), a town in Ningde, Fujian, China
Hubei Township (虎北乡), a township in Shenchi County, Shanxi, China